Randallstown is an unincorporated community and census-designated place in Baltimore County, Maryland, United States. It is named after Christopher and Thomas Randall, two 18th-century tavern-keepers. At that time, Randallstown was a tollgate crossroads on the Liberty Turnpike, a major east–west thoroughfare. Today it is a suburb of Baltimore, with a population of 33,655 as of the 2020 census. In the 1990s, Randallstown transitioned to a majority African American community.

Choate House was listed on the National Register of Historic Places in 1989.

Geography
Randallstown is located at  (39.375272, −76.796621).

Demographics

2020 Census

Note: the US Census treats Hispanic/Latino as an ethnic category. This table excludes Latinos from the racial categories and assigns them to a separate category. Hispanics/Latinos can be of any race.

2000 Census
As of the census of 2000, there were 30,870 people, 11,379 households, and 8,147 families living in the CDP. The racial makeup of the CDP was 72.11% African American, 23.18% White, 0.20% Native American, 2.21% Asian, 0.02% Pacific Islander, 0.54% from other races, and 1.74% from two or more races. Hispanic or Latino of any race were 1.54% of the population. 6% of Randallstown's residents were Sub-Saharan African, 5% German, 3% African, 3% West Indian, 3% Irish, 2% Russian, 2% English, 2% Nigerian, 2% Polish, 2% Italian, and 2% Jamaican.

There were 11,379 households, out of which 34.3% had children under the age of 18 living with them, 50.0% were married couples living together, 17.6% had a female householder with no husband present, and 28.4% were non-families. 23.8% of all households were made up of individuals, and 7.4% had someone living alone who was 65 years of age or older. The average household size was 2.65 and the average family size was 3.13.

In the CDP, the population was spread out, with 26.3% under the age of 18, 7.0% from 18 to 24, 30.2% from 25 to 44, 24.8% from 45 to 64, and 11.6% who were 65 years of age or older. The median age was 37 years. For every 100 females, there were 84.1 males. For every 100 females age 18 and over, there were 79.0 males.

The median income for a household in the CDP was $55,686, and the median income for a family was $59,789. Males had a median income of $39,455 versus $36,020 for females. The per capita income for the CDP was $24,059. About 5.2% of families and 6.5% of the population were below the poverty line, including 5.9% of those under age 18 and 5.3% of those age 65 or over.

History
Randallstown was founded in the 1700s by two brothers from England, Thomas and Christopher Randall.  They introduced a tavern on Liberty Road serving travelers.  In 1880, Randallstown had a population of 100.

Transportation

Roads
Some major roads in Randallstown are:
Deer Park Road
Liberty Road (MD-26)
Marriottsville Road
McDonogh Road
Old Court Road
Winands Road

Public transportation
While Randallstown was at one time the planned terminus for the Baltimore Metro Subway, the line was ultimately built to nearby Owings Mills. Though no stops on the line are actually in Randallstown, the three stops in Baltimore County are all within a close drive of the Randallstown area.

Bus service in Randallstown is available on the Maryland Transit Administration's bus routes 54 and 77. There is no bus link between Randallstown and nearby Carroll County, in part due to longstanding opposition to inter-county public transit from Carroll County officials and residents.

Notable people

 Victor Abiamiri, of the NFL Philadelphia Eagles, grew up in Randallstown 
 Dennis Chambers, professional drummer
 Michele S. Jones, former Command Sergeant Major, Obama administration liaison 
 Mario, R&B and pop singer
 Sisqo, of the R&B group Dru Hill
 Domonique Foxworth, former NFL athlete and NFLPA president, grew up in Randallstown
 Korryn Gaines, African-American woman killed by police whose death was widely covered

References

 
Census-designated places in Baltimore County, Maryland
Census-designated places in Maryland